Nechayevka is the name of several  rural localities in Russia.

Altai Krai
As of 2010, one rural locality in Altai Krai bears this name:
Nechayevka, Altai Krai, a settlement in Sverdlovsky Selsoviet of Khabarsky District

Belgorod Oblast
As of 2010, three rural localities in Belgorod Oblast bear this name:
Nechayevka, Belgorodsky District, Belgorod Oblast, a selo in Belgorodsky District
Nechayevka, Novooskolsky District, Belgorod Oblast, a settlement in Novooskolsky District
Nechayevka, Prokhorovsky District, Belgorod Oblast, a selo in Prokhorovsky District

Republic of Dagestan
As of 2010, one rural locality in the Republic of Dagestan bears this name:
Nechayevka, Republic of Dagestan, a selo in Nechayevsky Selsoviet of Kizilyurtovsky District

Lipetsk Oblast
As of 2010, two rural localities in Lipetsk Oblast bear this name:
Nechayevka, Khlevensky District, Lipetsk Oblast, a village in Sindyakinsky Selsoviet of Khlevensky District
Nechayevka, Zadonsky District, Lipetsk Oblast, a village in Kasharsky Selsoviet of Zadonsky District

Penza Oblast
As of 2010, two rural localities in Penza Oblast bear this name:
Nechayevka, Mokshansky District, Penza Oblast, a selo in Nechayevsky Selsoviet of Mokshansky District
Nechayevka, Nikolsky District, Penza Oblast, a selo in Ilminsky Selsoviet of Nikolsky District

Ryazan Oblast
As of 2010, one rural locality in Ryazan Oblast bears this name:
Nechayevka, Ryazan Oblast, a village in Osovsky Rural Okrug of Zakharovsky District

Saratov Oblast
As of 2010, two rural localities in Saratov Oblast bear this name:
Nechayevka, Bazarno-Karabulaksky District, Saratov Oblast, a village in Bazarno-Karabulaksky District
Nechayevka, Voskresensky District, Saratov Oblast, a selo in Voskresensky District

Voronezh Oblast
As of 2010, one rural locality in Voronezh Oblast bears this name:
Nechayevka, Voronezh Oblast, a selo in Usmanskoye 2-ye Rural Settlement of Novousmansky District

Yaroslavl Oblast
As of 2010, one rural locality in Yaroslavl Oblast bears this name:
Nechayevka, Yaroslavl Oblast, a village in Smolensky Rural Okrug of Pereslavsky District